Efim Liivik (20 March 1889 Meremäe Parish, Võru County – 4 March 1942 Sverdlovsk Oblast) was an Estonian politician. He was a member of V Riigikogu.

References

1889 births
1942 deaths
Members of the Riigikogu, 1932–1934
Estonian people who died in Soviet detention